There are several rivers named Dourado or Dourados River in Brazil:

 Dourado River (Minas Gerais)
 Dourado River (Rio Grande do Sul)
 Dourado River (São Paulo)
 Dourados River (Goiás)
 Dourados River (Mato Grosso do Sul)
 Dourados River (Minas Gerais)

See also 
 São José dos Dourados River
 Dorado River, Argentina
 Dourado (disambiguation)